Saline County Airport , also known as Watts Field, was a county-owned public-use airport located one mile (2 km) west of the central business district of Benton, a city in Saline County, Arkansas, United States. The airport's address was 401 Airline  Drive in Benton.

The airport opened in 1957. Construction on the new Saline County Regional Airport  began in November 2002 and it opened on March 12, 2007. The existing facility was closed after the new airport opened.

Facilities and aircraft 
For the 12-month period ending August 31, 2006, the airport had 39,000 aircraft operations, an average of 106 per day: 99% general aviation and 1% military. At that time there were 44 aircraft based at this airport: 95% single-engine and 5% helicopter.

References

External links 
Saline County Airport / Watts Field page at Saline County website
Map showing directions from Watts Field to Saline County Regional Airport

Defunct airports in the United States
Airports in Arkansas
Transportation in Saline County, Arkansas
Buildings and structures in Saline County, Arkansas
Benton, Arkansas